The David S. Palmer Arena is a multi-purpose arena in Danville, Illinois, that has a seating capacity of 4,750 for concerts and 2,350 for sports. It was built in 1980. Palmer Arena is the home for the Eastern Illinois University ice hockey club. Along with team sports, the David S. Palmer has open ice skating and hosts concerts from time to time and U.S. Figure Skating Basic Skills Program. The arena hosted the Vermilion County Bobcats of the Southern Professional Hockey League in the 2021–22 and 2022–23 seasons.

It was home to the Danville Dashers hockey team from 1981 until 1986 and later as the Danville Fighting Saints in the All-American Hockey League from 1986 to 1989. Hockey returned to arena with the Danville Wings junior hockey team, the Danville Pounders of the North Eastern Hockey League, and the Danville Inferno. From 2011 to 2020, it was home to another Danville Dashers of the Federal Prospects Hockey League. The arena has also hosted indoor football with the Danville Demolition for one season in 2007 while the Ultimate Indoor Football League planned to have a team in the arena in 2012 but never launched. In the 2015–16 season, it was the home of the Danville RiverHawks of the Premier Basketball League.

References

External links
 Website

Indoor ice hockey venues in Illinois
Buildings and structures in Danville, Illinois
Sports in Danville, Illinois
1980 establishments in Illinois
Indoor arenas in Illinois
Sports venues completed in 1980